Aristotle's Comet was a great comet which Aristotle saw in the winter of 373–372 BC.

References

Astronomical objects known since antiquity
Great comets
Non-periodic comets